Dwa Saray Ghar is the highest mountain of Buner, Lower Swat valley and Makhozi Shangla. Dwa Sary is situated on border between three districts Swat, Buner and Shangla, It is part of hinduraj mountains which is a sub-section of Hindukush mountains. It stands on the eastern side of Pir Baba and Gokand valley. It is called by this name because it has two heads or twin peaks. In Pashto language, "dwa" means two and "saray" means with head, i.e. the mountain with two heads. There are two close peaks with an inverted "W" shape.
It takes 6 hours hiking to reach the summit when you start your journey from Kalil top or pass (another hill station located in mountain boundary between Swat and Buner.

See also
 Falak Sar (Swat)
 Elum Ghar
 Manglawar
 List of Tourist attractions in Swat

References 

Tourist attractions in Swat
Manglawar
Mountains of Khyber Pakhtunkhwa